Dieze West is a football club from Zwolle, Netherlands.

History 
During the years 2015–2017, Dieze West played in Sunday Hoofdklasse. Since 2017, it plays in the Saturday Vierde Klasse.

References 

Football clubs in the Netherlands
Association football clubs established in 1982
1982 establishments in the Netherlands
Football clubs in Zwolle